Siegfried Rothe (born 18 January 1938) is a German long-distance runner. He competed in the men's 10,000 metres at the 1964 Summer Olympics.

References

1938 births
Living people
Athletes (track and field) at the 1964 Summer Olympics
German male long-distance runners
Olympic athletes of the United Team of Germany
Place of birth missing (living people)
20th-century German people